SPP1 or SPP-1 may refer to:
 SPP-1 underwater pistol, a USSR firearm made for Soviet frogmen
 Secreted phosphoprotein 1, a human gene product
 Suppressor of Pericarp Pigmentation 1, a maize gene implied in the phlobaphene metabolic pathway